Thomas Schneider (born 7 November 1988 in Forst, Bezirk Cottbus) is a German sprint athlete.

Achievements

References

1988 births
Living people
Sportspeople from Forst (Lausitz)
People from Bezirk Cottbus
German male sprinters
Olympic athletes of Germany
Athletes (track and field) at the 2012 Summer Olympics
European Athletics Championships medalists